Collegiate Crescent is a crescent forming part of the Broomhall Estate in S10, Sheffield, that intersects with Ecclesall Road. One of two long-standing campuses of Sheffield Hallam University, the facility is based in specially constructed buildings as well as many houses and villas on the left hand side of the crescent until the road crosses Park Lane. This university campus is referred to in the university as 'Collegiate Crescent' due to its location. The Collegiate Crescent campus is home to the university's School of Cultural Studies and is also the university's main sports site.

Sheffield Hallam's £15m "beacon for health and social care education" was officially opened at Collegiate Crescent by the University Chancellor, Professor the Lord Winston, in May 2005.

It was the site of the former City of Sheffield Training College, a teacher training institute and one of the predecessor institutions of the university. Hence alumni of the former college are known as "Crescenters".

References

Sheffield Hallam University